The following elections occurred in the year 1913.

 1912 Argentine legislative election
 1913 Danish Folketing election
 1913 Dutch general election
 1913 Finnish parliamentary election
 1913 Italian general election
 1913 Newfoundland general election

Europe
 1913 Croatian parliamentary election

United Kingdom
 1913 Altrincham by-election
 1913 Chesterfield by-election
 1913 Newmarket by-election
 1913 Shrewsbury by-election

North America

Canada
 1913 Alberta general election
 1913 Edmonton municipal election
 1913 Newfoundland general election
 1913 Toronto municipal election

United States
 1913 New York state election

Oceania

Australia
 1913 Australian federal election
 1913 Australian referendum
 1913 Tasmanian state election

New Zealand
 1913 Grey by-election
 1913 Lyttelton by-election

See also
 :Category:1913 elections

1913
Elections